The 2016 French Open Men's singles final was the championship tennis match of the Men's Singles tournament at the 2016 French Open. A significant part of the Djokovic–Murray rivalry, it pitted the world's top two players, Novak Djokovic and Andy Murray, against each other in a Grand Slam final for the seventh time.

After three hours and three minutes, World No. 1 Djokovic defeated second seed Murray 3–6, 6–1, 6–2, 6–4 to win the match. By winning the 2016 French Open, Djokovic not only completed a career Grand Slam, he also became the first man since Rod Laver in 1969 to hold all four Major titles simultaneously, while he also became the first man since Jim Courier in 1992 to win the Australian and French Open titles in the same calendar year.

Background

The match took place on the final day of the 2016 edition of the 15-day French Open, held every May and June.

In the lead-up to the French Open, Djokovic and Murray contested the finals at both the Madrid and Rome Masters in May; these were the first two times that the pair contested a final on clay. Both dethroned each other as the defending champion, with Djokovic defeating Murray in Madrid by way of a three-set win and Murray reversing the result in Rome with a straight-sets victory.

Djokovic entered the French Open as the favourite for the tournament, and after winning each of his first three matches in straight sets, his title chances multiplied when nine-times champion Rafael Nadal withdrew mid-tournament due to a wrist injury. En route to the final, he dropped just one set, the first one in his fourth-round match against Roberto Bautista-Agut.

Murray, on the other hand, endured consecutive five-set matches against Radek Štěpánek and Mathias Bourgue in his first two matches; in the former, he was two-sets-to-love down and was two points away from what would've been his earliest defeat at the French Open since 2006 before he rallied to win in five sets. He proceeded to win his next two matches in straight sets, before defeating Richard Gasquet and defending champion Stan Wawrinka in the quarter and semi-finals respectively to reach his first French Open final. His win over Wawrinka was regarded as "his best ever performance on clay".

Match
Andy Murray won the pre-match coin toss and elected to serve first. He was broken to love in the opening game of the match, but he would break straight back and would hold the remainder of his service games to take the opening set 6–3. At that point, history seemed to favour Murray, who had never previously lost a match at Roland Garros after winning the opening set, while he had also not lost a match after winning the opening set in 49 consecutive Grand Slam matches dating back to Wimbledon in 2013.

However, Djokovic would hit back in the second set, taking the second and third sets for the loss of just three games to take a two-sets-to-one lead. In the fourth, Djokovic broke twice to hold a 5–2 lead, but would double-fault on break point down to surrender one of those breaks, reducing the margin to 5–3. After Murray held once more, Djokovic converted his third match point to win the match in four sets and finally break his French Open curse.

Officials
The chair umpire throughout the match was Damien Dumusois.

Statistics

Source

Murray and Djokovic about the match
Following the match, Djokovic thanked his coaching staff and family for their support:

He also extended his praise to Murray:

Murray conceded that Djokovic was the better player on the day, and that he didn't play as well as he did.

Reaction
Djokovic's French Open victory was met with a positive reaction around the tennis community, with rival players including Juan Martín del Potro, Milos Raonic and Marin Čilić among those paying tribute and offering their congratulations towards Djokovic.

Pat Cash analysed the match and said on the BBC Sport website:

See also
Djokovic–Murray rivalry
2012 US Open – Men's singles final
2013 Wimbledon Championships – Men's singles final

References

External links
 Match details at the official ATP site
 Player head-to-head at the official ATP site
  Extended highlights on YouTube

Men's singles final
Andy Murray tennis matches
Novak Djokovic tennis matches
2016